Luis Hernán Díaz Villegas (4 November 1945 – 24 November 2021) was a Colombian cyclist. He reached the quarterfinal in the individual pursuit event at the 1972 Summer Olympics. 

Díaz was born in Buga, Valle del Cauca on 4 November 1945. He died from cancer on 24 November 2021, at the age of 76.

Career
1976
1st in Stage 5 Vuelta a Colombia, Tunja (COL)
1st in Stage 12 Vuelta a Colombia, Cali (COL)
1st in Stage 14 Vuelta a Colombia, Medellín (COL)

References

External links
 

1945 births
2021 deaths
Colombian male cyclists
Olympic cyclists of Colombia
Cyclists at the 1972 Summer Olympics
Sportspeople from Valle del Cauca Department
Place of death missing
20th-century Colombian people
21st-century Colombian people